Love of Lesbian is a Spanish indie pop band. They were nominated for the MTV Europe Music Award for Best Spanish Act at the 2012 MTV Europe Music Awards. Their album La noche eterna. Los días no vividos. reached number 1 in 2012.

On March 27, 2021, the band held the first large-scale concert in Spain as a test of reducing restrictions on large gatherings during the COVID-19 pandemic.

Members 
 Santi Balmes – vocals, guitar, piano, keyboards, synthesizers
 Oriol Bonet – drums, percussion, programming
 Joan Ramón Planell – bass guitar, synthesizers
 Jordi Roig – guitar, keyboards
 Julián Saldarriaga – guitar, synthesizers, sequencer, percussion, vocals

Touring members
 Dani Ferrer – keyboards, trumpet

Discography

Albums

Singles

Compilation albums 
 Maniobras en Japón (2010,  Music Bus/Warner Music)
 John Boy (2011, Warner Music)
 Últimos días de 1999: Aquellas noches de incendion (2011, Warner Music)

Awards and nominations

Note: At the 17th Annual Latin Grammy Awards, Sergio Mora was nominated for Best Recording Package as the art director for El Poeta Halley.

Videography 
"Freakie goes to Hollywood" (1999)
"Is it fictions?" (2002)
"Wasted days" (2002)
"Domingo Astromántico"
"Houston, tenemos un poema" (2005)
"Universos Infinitos" (2007)
"La Niña Imantada" (2007)
"Noches Reversibles" (2007)
"Me amo" (2007)
"Allí donde solíamos gritar" (2009)
"Club de fans de John Boy" (2009)
"Cuestiones de familia" (2009)
"Segundo Asalto" (2009)
"Te hiero mucho" (2009)
"1999" (2009)
"Oniria e insomnia" (2012)
"Si tú me dices Ben, yo digo Affleck" (2012)
"Wío, antenas y pijamas" (2012)
"Pizzigatos" (2012)
"Los días no vividos" (2012)
"Bajo el Volcán" (2016)

References

External links

Musical groups from Catalonia
1997 establishments in Spain
Musical groups established in 1997